Al Mabarra Club is a football club based in Tarik Al-Matar, a district in Beirut, Lebanon, that competes in the . Established in 1987, they won one Lebanese FA Cup in 2008.

The club had promoted gradually along the different divisions, before reaching the Lebanese Premier League for the first time in 1989. Backed by Hassan Fadlallah, Mabarra have Shia ties.

History 
Founded in 1980 by Mohammad Hussein Fadallah, Mabarra officially received their license in 1987. In 1993–94 Mabarra were relegated to the Lebanese Fourth Division, and were able to gain promotion to the Third Division, then the Second Division, and finally to the Premier League.

Honours
Lebanese FA Cup
Winners (1): 2007–08
Runners-up (1): 2009–10
Lebanese Second Division
Winners (1): 1987–88, 2012–13 (Group B)
Lebanese Super Cup
Runners-up (1): 2008

Performance in AFC competitions
AFC Cup: 1 appearance
2009: Group stage

See also 
 List of football clubs in Lebanon

References

External links
AFC team profile

 
Football clubs in Lebanon
1969 establishments in Lebanon
Sport in Beirut
Organisations based in Beirut